The Belarusian partisan movement is an ongoing campaign of resistance against the authoritarian regime of Alexander Lukashenko. It began in response to the violent suppression of the 2020–2021 Belarusian protests. The partisans aim to depose Lukashenko's government and expel Russian troops from Belarus.

History

2021
The Belarusian partisan movement emerged after the suppression of the 2020–2021 Belarusian protests. The Cyber Partisans conducted a campaign of cyberattacks on the regime's internet infrastructure in mid-2021, including the release of personal information of thousands of regime officials, police, military, and regime propagandists. Throughout the year, partisans participated in blocking railways, destroying CCTV, damaging infrastructure used by the regime, and actions against regime officials.

2022
Partisan activity increased in the buildup to the 2022 Russian invasion of Ukraine. In mid-January, the Cyber Partisans launched a cyberattack on infrastructure of Belarusian Railways, severely delaying the movement of Russian transport in Belarus; they stated they would decrypt the systems upon the release of 50 prisoners and Russian troops being removed from Belarus. During the Battle of Kyiv, BYPOL and Belarusian partisans published information on how to disable railway signalling boxes, which severely disrupted the Russian logistic network. In March near Babrujsk, regime security services fired on partisans who set fire railway signals; and by late April there were at least 11 partisans detained.

After the formation of the Kastuś Kalinoŭski Regiment, and their assurances that they will liberate Belarus, representatives of BYPOL stated that they would welcome a national liberation of Belarus if circumstances allow it.

2023
On the 26th of February, 2023, a Beriev A-50 aircraft of the Russian Air Force at Mačuliščy air base was damaged and two explosions were heard. BYPOL claimed that Belarusian partisans were responsible for the disabling of the aircraft.

Reactions
The Lukashenko regime has cracked down harshly on partisans. Belarusian courts, which are under regime control, have placed terror charges on partisans, a charge which carries the death penalty in Belarus.

References

2020 in Belarus
2020–2021 Belarusian protests
2021 in Belarus
2022 in Belarus
Belarusian opposition
Rebellions in Belarus
Resistance during the 2022 Russian invasion of Ukraine
Resistance movements
Belarus in the Russo-Ukrainian War